Cecil Dumond (born 8 April 1987) is a South African rugby union player, currently playing with the Northam Rhinos. He is a utility back.

Career

Youth

Leopards

He made no first class appearances in 2008, but returned as a fly-half for their 2009 Currie Cup Premier Division season, scoring 71 points over the course of the season. A further twelve appearances followed in 2010, but he only made two substitute appearances in the 2011 Vodacom Cup.

SWD Eagles

Border Bulldogs

Falcons

Other
In addition to his first class career, he also represented Potchefstroom-based university side  in the 2009, 2010 and 2011 Varsity Cup competitions and he played for Despatch in the inaugural SARU Community Cup competition in 2013.

Personal
He is the younger brother of fly-half Monty Dumond.

References

South African rugby union players
Living people
1987 births
Border Bulldogs players
Leopards (rugby union) players
SWD Eagles players
Rugby union fly-halves
Rugby union players from North West (South African province)